The Milton Masonic Lodge and County General Store in Milton, Kentucky was listed on the National Register of Historic Places in 1983.

It is a two-story three-bay brick building with a hipped roof, built in the last quarter of the 1800s for the Masonic Lodges in Milton, with first-floor commercial space.  It continued to serve as a lodge hall through the date of its NRHP listing.

References

Former Masonic buildings in Kentucky
National Register of Historic Places in Trimble County, Kentucky
Commercial buildings on the National Register of Historic Places in Kentucky
Clubhouses on the National Register of Historic Places in Kentucky
General stores in the United States